Arcobacter butzlerei is a common Campylobacter-like organism. Its clinical and microbial features are similar to the food pathogen Campylobacter jejuni. It is associated with persistent, watery diarrhea.

References

External links 

Type strain of Arcobacter butzleri at BacDive -  the Bacterial Diversity Metadatabase

Campylobacterota